This is the discography documenting albums and singles released by the American female vocal group Labelle.  The group was known as The Ordettes from 1958 to 1961 and The Blue Belles (a.k.a. Patti La Belle and Her Blue Belles; Patti LaBelle and the Bluebelles) from 1962 to 1970, changing their name to simply Labelle in 1971.

Albums

Studio albums

Live albums
Sweethearts of the Apollo (1963, Newtown)
The Bluebelles on Stage (1965, Parkway)

Compilation albums
Golden Classics (1993, Collectables)
Over the Rainbow: The Atlantic Years (1994, Ichiban)
Lady Marmalade: The Best of Patti and Labelle (1995, Legacy/Epic)
Something Silver (1997, Warner Bros.)
The Best of the Early Years (1999, Hip-O)
The Anthology (2017, SoulMusic)

Singles

 "I Sold My Heart to the Junkman" was recorded by The Starlets but was credited as The Blue Bells.

Other appearances

References

External links

Rhythm and blues discographies
Discographies of American artists